Arthur Blair-White (3 July 1891, in County Dublin – 29 April 1975, in County Donegal) third child of Richard Blair White of Dublin and Emily Maud Nichols of New Zealand educated at Rugby School and Trinity College Dublin fought in the First World War—Croix de Guerre, Military order of the British Empire, mentioned in dispatches married Rosetta Phoebe Newell in 1919 who played tennis for Ireland—was an Irish cricketer. A right-handed batsman and occasional wicket-keeper, he played just once for Ireland, a first-class match against Scotland in July 1913.

In 1918, he married Irish tennis player Phoebe Blair-White. In the 1960s, they moved to Lifford, County Donegal, and later, they lived in Strabane County Tyrone. He is buried in Lifford, County Donegal beside his wife.

References

External links
Cricket Archive profile
Cricinfo profile
CricketEurope Stats Zone profile

1891 births
1975 deaths
Irish cricketers
Cricketers from County Dublin
People educated at Rugby School
Alumni of Trinity College Dublin
British Army personnel of World War I